Magnolia Mall is a shopping mall in Florence, South Carolina, near I-95. It is owned by Pennsylvania Real Estate Investment Trust. The mall opened in 1979, and underwent a renovation in 2008. It underwent a further renovation in 2019, adding H&M, Five Below, and Burlington. Other major stores at the mall are Best Buy, Belk, Dick's Sporting Goods, and J. C. Penney. Burlington replaced a Sears which closed in 2017. On June 4, 2020, JCPenney announced that it would close by around October 2020 as part of a plan to close 154 stores nationwide. In October 2021, Tilt Studios opened in the former space occupied by JCPenney. 

Roses was an original tenant of the mall, and closed in 2002 to be replaced by Best Buy and the food court.

References

External links
 Official website

Buildings and structures in Florence, South Carolina
Shopping malls in South Carolina
Shopping malls established in 1979
Pennsylvania Real Estate Investment Trust
1979 establishments in South Carolina